The contributions and influence of American artist Madonna (born 1958) in the landscape of underground and contemporary arts have been documented by a variety of sources such as art publications, scholars and art critics. As her footprints in the arts are lesser-known compared to her other roles, this led a contributor from W to conclude that both her impact and influence in the art world have been "made almost entirely behind the scenes". She is noted for taking inspiration from various painters in her career. Once called a "continuous multi-media art project", a panel of art critics explained that she condenses fashion, dance, photography, sculpture, music, video and painting in her own artwork.

Madonna's interest in the arts began in her early life. When she moved to New York City to pursue a career in modern dance, she befriended and dated various plastic artists, including Andy Warhol, Martin Burgoyne, Keith Haring and her boyfriend Jean-Michel Basquiat. Around that time, Madonna's graffiti tag was "Boy Toy", which later used in her professional career, and immortalized their friendship in the song "Graffiti Heart".

Madonna is an art collector, included among Art & Antiques 100 Biggest Collectors. She has been also known as an "art supporter" and has used art for charity. In 2001, Madonna lent her Self-Portrait with Monkey by Frida Kahlo at the Tate Modern, which was the first British exhibition dedicated to Kahlo. Madonna sponsored various art exhibitions of contemporary artists such as Basquiat, Cindy Sherman and Tina Modotti. Her other activities include to co-initiate "Art for Freedom" in 2012, runs the artistic installation X-STaTIC Pro=CeSS (2003) and create the NFT digital artworks, "Mother of Creation" along with Mike Winkelmann ("Beeple") in 2022.

Throughout her career, her visuals and style have attracted both celebratory and derogatory commentaries. Late-twentieth-century views on Madonna were a constant amid low and high culture, with some labeling her a modernist. By the next century, Dahlia Schweitzer said that many critics have long resisted using the words "Madonna" and "artistic" in the same sentence, while for supporters like art historian Kyra Belán, Madonna is a "symbol for female achievement" in different art forms. Called a contemporary gesamtkunstwerk and the art-pop queen, American performing artist David Blaine said that perhaps she "is herself her own greatest work of art—something so vastly influential as to be unfathomable". Her influence has been noted in various contemporary artists including Mateo Blanco, Trisha Baga and Pegasus. Various artists have depicted Madonna either once or multiple times, including Peter Howson, Andrew Logan, Sebastian Krüger and Al Hirschfeld. Madonna's likeness and some of her own works have also been displayed in art and galleries exhibitions around the world, including the video of "Bedtime Story", which became part of Museum of Modern Art's permanent collection.

Background

Early life: formative years

Madonna's background with the arts, and how it influenced her future career, have been documented. In a conversation with curator Vince Aletti, the singer said that her interest in art started as a child because several members of her family could paint and draw, but she couldn't: "I was living vicariously through them", said. She visited the Detroit Institute of Arts, which is how she found out about Frida Kahlo and started reading about her. Madonna also mentioned her Catholic education, saying "there's art everywhere" in the churches, "so you get introduced to it that way".

From early on, Madonna's father encouraged his children to take classes related to art disciplines. He wanted her to take piano lessons, which she tried. While music was on her agenda, the piano wasn't. Madonna had a friend who was taking ballet lessons, and she talked her father into letting her take ballet instead of piano. For Madonna, dance was a gateway for discovery in other arts in which she has maintained a lifelong interest. She studied in the performing arts school dance, music theory and art history. She also took a Shakespearean course.

In Rochester School of Ballet, she met its instructor Christopher Flynn, who took a special interest in helping her succeed. Flynn took it upon himself to become her mentor, impressed by her talent and ambition, exposing her to Detroit's museums, operas, concerts, art galleries, and fashion shows. Her tastes broadened to include classical music, Pre-Raphaelite painters, and poets.

Arrival at New York City: late-1970s 
Madonna pursued a career in modern dance, moving to New York City in the late 1970s. She attended numerous museums for free, and worked as an art nude model in art schools. This brought her into contact with painters and photographers. Madonna declared: "People painted me all the time". She briefly took classes of photography, painting and drawing.

Personal relationships

Shortly after her arrival in New York, outlet Contemporary Art explained that Madonna made her first connection with the local art scene in clubs located in the Lower East Side and SoHo, including Danceteria, The Limelight, The Roxy, Funhouse, Mudd Club and the Paradise Garage, frequented by School of Visual Arts artists and others. She befriended various painters, graffiti and visual artists such as Keith Haring, Futura 2000, Fab Five Freddy and Daze. In 1979, she met graffiti artist Norris Burroughs, with whom she had a brief relationship.

Artist Martin Burgoyne, was her roommate on the Lower East Side, and became her best friend. In an interview with Austin Scaggs, she said that a roommate introduced her to Haring, but she was already aware of his art. Her then boyfriend Jean-Michel Basquiat, introduced Madonna to Andy Warhol, Glenn O'Brien, and Larry Gagosian. Gagosian recalled that Basquiat said, "She'll be the biggest pop star in the world". O'Brien later edited Madonna's 1992 Sex book and worked with her on The Girlie Show World Tour book in 1993. Madonna met Darlene Lutz through O'Brien, who became her personal art advisor from 1983 to 2004.

In an interview with illusionist David Blaine in 2014, Madonna talked about the close relationship she had with Burgoyne, Haring and Basquiat, as they hung out together with Warhol joining them sometimes. She further adds: "We found each other, and we connected to each other [...] They supported my shows. I supported their shows. We were a unit. And I don't even know how it happened. It just did". She wrote an article for The Guardian in 1996, discussing her relationship with Basquiat, and wrote about her friendship with Haring in Keith Haring: The Authorized Biography (1992) by art critic John Gruen. Madonna further immortalized their friendship in the song "Graffiti Heart" from her 2015 album, Rebel Heart. Madonna is also mentioned in Warhol's diary The Andy Warhol Diaries. In 2019, Sky Arts' Urban Myths dedicated an episode, Madonna & Basquiat to their relationship.

During the spent time with her graffiti artist friends in New York, she used the graffiti tag "Boy Toy", making her own graffiti in walks, subways or sidewalks. The moniker referred to one of her boyfriends, RP3, a subway scratchitti artist who also used the tag and gave it to her. She later used it as the name of her copyright company, as well as a belt buckle of her dress worn for her Like a Virgin-era. Art critic Hilton Kramer commented about Madonna and Cindy Sherman: "As for their relationship, I think they eminently deserve each other".

Implementation and influence in her work

Considered a visual artist and performer, Canadian professor Karlene Faith once echoed "her abundant talent as a visual artist". Thomas Harrison, from the University of Central Florida, recognized various female artists before Madonna, but he felt she "took it to a whole other level" always embracing the visual aspects. The Irish Times staffers even regarded Madonna as "the first female pop star to fully engage with the visual elements of her art".

Her visual style was once often described as pop art. Martha Bayles, said she cultivated a "heavy-duty pop art image". Editor Paul Flynn called her "a pop artist in the Warholian sense of the word", while John R. May, from Louisiana State University said she was "probably Andy Warhol's dream come to life". May further describes her as a "successful piece of pop art" and as "a splendor formae of aesthetic". In Pastiche: Cultural Memory in Art, Film, Literature (2001), Ingeborg Hoesterey from Indiana University, asserts:

Madonna's knowledge of the arts was also commented on. Richard R. Burt cites a reporter who saw her as an "astute if untrained art critic". In 2019, Donatella Versace wrote for L'Officiel, Madonna is "informed" and culturally aware enough to hold her own on subjects ranging from music to art. Los Angeles Times critic Patrick Goldstein once commented about her attendance at "Degenerate Art" (1991) held in Los Angeles County Museum of Art, "she's savvy enough" but her "interests are largely visual". Madonna herself, declared that her primarily interest in art are "suffering, and irony and a certain bizarre sense of humour". She was also described a "knowledgeable about photography", according to British art historian John A. Walker. Photography critic Vince Aletti even commented her works "are filled with knowledgeable photographic references". In his Madonna biography, Andrew Morton commented that her "stunning visual sense" is no accident; Madonna has spent a lifetime studying photographs, black-and-white movies and paintings.

Influences for Madonna

Madonna is reported to be often inspired by the visual artists she collects. She once stated: "Every video I've done has been inspired by some painting or work of art". Decades noted art as being part of her personal life and professional career. In 2020, she said: "Art has kept me alive".

A number of observers have commented about specific artists. Scholar Kocku von Stuckrad recalls how Frida Kahlo became her role model, with Madonna saying: "Her work was very confessional [but] you never knew exactly what was true and what was false and what she was overdramatizing [...] That's how I think of my work [...] People put me into all different categories [...] But I love contradiction". About Andy Warhol, Pamela Robertson from the University of Notre Dame writes that although he influenced Bowie and Reed, "his true heir is Madonna. She captures the full force of Warhol". French academic Georges-Claude Guilbert further describes him as the "virtual father of Madonna". Scholars Sandra M. Gilbert and Susan Gubar agreed that "the work of Cindy Sherman prefigured Madonna's style in the art world". Glenn Ward, wrote in Understand Postmodernism: Teach Yourself (2010) that "Madonna's work can be compared to that of the American artist Cindy Sherman". A portrait of Lee Miller kissing another woman by Man Ray that she owns, inspired her and encouraged the use of lesbian imagery.

Walker commented that Picasso was a precedent for Madonna's reinventions, as he was an artist who changed his style a number of times. Madonna herself stated in 2015: "I like to compare myself to other kinds of artists, like Picasso". Madonna also commented that she believes there is not a time or expiration date for being creative. Like Picasso, she adds, "he kept painting and painting until the day he died". In an interview with Vice that year, she responded about a question regarding death: "I want to live forever, and I'm going to", through her art.

Collaborations with artists
N.B. This section only includes a brief description

Madonna's friend Martin Burgoyne designed the cover art of  "Burning Up" (1983), which featured a grid of twenty postage stamp-sized portraits of Madonna in every color of the rainbow. She also collaborated with her brother Christopher Ciccone, who became the art director of her tours Blond Ambition World Tour and The Girlie Show. Graffiti artist Michael Stewart appeared as a dancer in her debut music video "Everybody".

Street artist Mr. Brainwash entered the music scene when Madonna commissioned him to design the cover art of Celebration, designing 15 different covers to the wide release, including singles, the video compilation, and a special edition vinyl. Brainwash worked again with Madonna, for the opening of her Hard Candy Fitness in Toronto, creating an 11-by-30-foot Madonna mural live on-site. In 2017, Madonna invited Brazilian street artist Eduardo Kobra to paint two murals at the Mercy James Institute for Pediatric Surgery and Intensive Care. In 2012, she participated in a Madonna inspired contest sponsored by Johnnie Walker in Brazil, where she chose graffiti artist Simeone Sapienza to create the artwork of her single "Superstar".

Brazilian visual artist Aldo Diaz was hired by Madonna to work on the covers of her single "Bitch I'm Madonna" and the Rebel Heart Tour, Madonna: Tears of a Clown's catalog and her official 2018 calendar. According to Artnet, American visual artist Marilyn Minter has collaborated with Madonna. She also made close collaborative with fine-art, portrait and fashion photographers.

Footprints in the art scene

Madonna has made several appearances on the art scene. In this regard, Kriston Capps from New York magazine said that "Madonna has arguably been edging around the corners of contemporary art her entire career". In 2016, Rain Embuscado from Artnet commented that she "has always had a hand in the art world". British art historian, John A. Walker has documented her life and career from the perspective of the arts. In 1990, the arts-based BBC1 series Omnibus broadcast a profile on Madonna, which was watched by 7.7 million people; slightly higher than the average audience of 3.1 million.

Activities and contributions
In 2001, she presented the Turner Prize at Tate Britain in London, receiving positive comments from BBC's art correspondent, Rosie Millard. It was called as "a rare marriage of pop and art". British linguistic Roy Harris said: "The merger between art and showbiz is symbolized by the choice of Madonna". Peter Leese from Jagiellonian University, commented that "the fashionable status of the new art was confirmed when Madonna came to London to host the awards ceremony".

In 2014, she presented the Innovation Award of The Wall Street Journal at MoMA to her former dancer, Charles Riley for his contributions to the performing arts. In 2017, she was the special guest with visual artist Marilyn Minter at A Year of Yes: Reimagining Feminism at the Brooklyn Museum in its special segment Brooklyn Talks: Madonna x Marilyn where both addressed topics of art and culture. The event was moderated by Anne Pasternak, Elizabeth Alexander, Shelby White and Leon Levy.

Alex Greenberger from Artspace confirmed that Madonna has also made art. In 2003, she collaborated with Steven Klein on the art installation X-STaTIC Pro=CeSS which was displayed at international art galleries such as Deitch Projects, Gagosian Gallery and Camera Work in Berlin. The multimedia exhibit was touted as "Madonna's art world debut". According to art critic Walter Robinson, the installations were priced at $35,000–$65,000, with a run of 1,000 copies of the catalogue priced at $350 plus taxes. Robinson describes the project as "too cheesy to be art" but "philosophically speaking, no slight accomplishment in art world that privileges everything". English author Lucy O'Brien described it as one of Madonna's most fascinating projects, and also commented it marked her transition into a new phase through her use of visuals.

In 2013, Madonna co-initiated "Art for Freedom" with Vice magazine, as an effort to support independent creators of art content around the world and to promote and facilitate artistic and free expression, giving a monthly award to a budding artist. Essayist Lisa Robertson commented that Madonna became a curator in the "stricter sense". Madonna appeared at Gagosian Gallery in New York, to mark the launch of the initiative, with a performance showing the singer bound, handcuffed, and dragged onstage by performers in police uniforms.

In 2022, along with digital artist Mike Winkelmann ("Beeple"), Madonna created a NFT project called "Mother of Creation" consisting of three videos, namely "Mother of Nature", "Mother of Evolution" and "Mother of Technology". Each of the digital artworks is accompanied by music and a voiceover by Madonna, who reads poetry by poet Jalaluddin Rumi and reportedly spent one year creating the project. Launched in the NTF platform SuperRare, the project became a subject of scrutiny, with Gareth Harris from The Art Newspaper saying: "There have been stranger collaborations in the art world, but not many have been as headline-hitting as the newly minted partnership between Queen of Pop Madonna and 'Beeple'". The art magazine Apollo was "delighted by what passes for an expression on the face of Madonna of the NFT". In January 2023, Madonna joined forces with Vanity Fair in their first issue "Icon", and according to Billboard her artistic photoshoot will spin off a "future exhibition, a short movie and an urban art performance". On January 24, their short film The Enlightenment was uploaded on Madonna's YouTube account.

Art exhibitions
Madonna "has quietly sponsored many [art] exhibitions over the years", wrote Máire Ní Fhlathúin in The Legacy of Colonialism (1998). Madonna's then-art adviser, recalled: "Madonna doesn't want or need the press for everything she does".

In 1992, Madonna sponsored the first Jean-Michel Basquiat museum retrospective at the Whitney Museum of American Art. In 1995, she sponsored the first major retrospective of Tina Modotti at the Philadelphia Museum of Art on which curator and art historian Anne d'Harnoncourt commented: "She seemed a natural sponsor for an exhibition that introduces the artist to a broader public". Kristine Ibsen from University of Notre Dame said that the exhibition was possible thanks to "a generous donation by Madonna" and occurred just a few months short of the centennial of Modotti's birth in August 1896. In 1996, Madonna sponsored an exhibition of Basquiat's paintings at the Serpentine Gallery in London. Madonna was the only sponsor for the Cindy Sherman's first retrospective Untitled Film Stills at the Museum of Modern Art (MoMA) in 1997.

She has visited numerous museums, including various attendances at MoMA launch parties, and at Tate galleries while she lived in the United Kingdom. For the latter museum, she lent Kahlo's Self-Portrait with Monkey at Tate Modern, which was the first British exhibition dedicated to Frida Kahlo. The decision to loan the painting only came after several weeks of negotiation, which was partly delayed due the September 11 attacks. Jennifer Mundy, curator of the exhibition, expressed: "Clearly something about this show persuaded Madonna to lend". Commenting on the loan, Madonna said: "Loaning my Frida to Tate is like letting go of one of my precious children, but I know she will be in good hands and the exhibit would not be complete without her".

Art collecting

Madonna is an art collector, with a collection worth between $100 million and $160 million. Artnet deemed her possessions a blue-chip collection. Madonna started collecting after receiving her first paycheck in the early 1980s; she hired Darlene Lutz as her personal art dealer, who worked with her from 1983 to 2004. Both Darlene, and Madonna's brother Christopher Ciccone, bid at auctions on her behalf, with a budget no larger than $5 million.

Her collection is based primarily on modernists, and includes over 300 pieces of artists such as Salvador Dalí, Pablo Picasso, Fernand Léger and Frida Kahlo. She also acquired works by Old Masters, including Italian painter Master of 1310. Austin Scaggs asked Madonna if she has paintings of her friends Warhol and Haring and her former boyfriend Basquiat; "Have a few of each", she replied. Madonna revealed in a 2015 interview with Howard Stern that after their romantic relationship ended, Basquiat took back the paintings he had given her and destroyed them, painting over them black. She regrets giving the art back, but "felt pressured to do so since it was something he had created". In 2021, she posted a series of photos of herself at home with a Basquiat drawing of her portrait. Madonna also collects artistic portrait pictures. In the 1990s, she paid $165,000 for Modotti's Roses then the highest price ever commanded by a print at auction.

Morton explained that her collection meant so much to her that she would rather be remembered as a modern-day Peggy Guggenheim than as a singer and actress. Madonna was quoted as saying, "Paintings are my secret garden and my passion. My reward and my nice sin". Madonna appeared among the 100 Biggest Collectors by Art & Antiques, and within the Top 25 Art Collectors by The Hollywood Reporter in 2013. A spokesman of Tate Gallery, called her a "distinguished art collector".

Art supporter

The works Untitled (1985) by American painter Julia Wachtel and The Six Second Epic (1986) by Kenji Fujita were bought by the Brooklyn Museum with funds from Madonna "Ciccone Penn". Madonna has been regarded as an "art-lover", and is also known as a supporter of modern art. According to Tate Gallery, Madonna has a long-standing interest in contemporary British art. Anthropologist Néstor García Canclini recognized Madonna's support for feminist art.

Madonna has supported or benefited a number of unknown artists, by exposing their works on social media or purchasing their works. Some examples were reported by media. One of them, Scottish painter, Michael Forbes gained briefly media attention when Madonna shared one of his creations, and which Forbes expressed it was inspired in his admirations towards the singer and influence amid the gay community.

During the Rebel Heart era, she invited her fandom through an online contest to create fan art to display in backdrop videos for her Rebel Heart Tour. Some of them, became part of an art exhibition in Italy at the Palazzo Saluzzo di Paesana titled Iconic – Portraits & Artwork inspired by The Queen curated by Gabriele Ferrarotti and Ettore Ventura with 50 pieces chosen by Madonna from 20 artists around the world.

Her brother Christopher Ciccone wrote in Life with My Sister Madonna how she encouraged him by commenting on his artworks, "I like them, you should keep on painting". Ciccone reported that her sister lent him $200,000 to buy a studio where he began to paint regularly. Madonna's son Rocco, with British filmmaker Guy Ritchie has used the pseudonym "Rhed". Madonna expressed her support for him on social media, before his identity was revealed. Art critic Jonathan Jones suggested "that the artist had been put into the public eye too soon".

Art for charity

She has used art for charity. A canvas painting by Madonna went to a charity auction in 1991, and was bought by actor Jason Hervey. She hosted a family art sale with two of her children to raise money for victims of the 2020 Beirut explosion. In 2022, Madonna and Anthony Vaccarello curated and organized Sex by Madonna at Art Basel from November 29 to December 4, a free-pass pop-up exhibition honoring the 30 years of her first book Sex. A re-edition of 800 copies was released with the proceeds going to her charitable organization, Raising Malawi.

In 2013, Madonna sold the 1921 work Three Women at the Red Table of Fernand Léger which she bought in 1990 for $3.4 million, raising $7.2 million. This was in support of female education through her Ray of Light Foundation. The action was reportedly a combination of her passions for art and education, with Madonna declaring: "I want to trade something valuable for something invaluable – Educating Girls!". In 2016, during her Madonna: Tears of a Clown at Art Basel, Miami she held an art auction to benefit Madonna's Raising Malawi, as well as art and education initiatives. She auctioned pieces of artists such as Damien Hirst and Tracey Emin. Combined with other personal belongings, she raised more than $7.5 million.

When her project "Art for Freedom" was operating, she donated $10,000 each month to a nonprofit organization of a featured artist's choice. Her NFT project with "Beeple" generated primary auction sales volume of $612,000, destined to three charities picked by Madonna and "Beeple".

Controversies

Madonna created controversy when she presented the Turner Prize in 2001 to Martin Creed and told the audience: "Right on, motherfuckers— everyone is a winner!". In Is Art History Global? (2013), art historian James Elkins quotes Glyn Davis by saying on the event: "It would, of course, be inappropriate to see this as a radical intervention in art historical discourse. However, the clash of Nicholas Serota and pop icon Madonna produces its own pleasurable frisson; seeing a woman talk about art on television remains a rare sight, and it always to be welcome". British art historian, Julian Stallabrass was convinced that the intention without doubt of having Madonna announce the Tate's Turner Prize, was to raise the profile of the event further. However, Stallabrass stated that the effect and the art displayed took on the role of more or less interesting diversions to the main spectacle of the "singer's publicity-hungry misbehaviour".

Madonna's NFT videos produced along with "Beeple", received criticism from art critics like Ben Davis for her fully nude digitalized 3D character, while giving birth to butterflies, trees, and insects such as robotic centipedes through an actual scan of her genitals. She defended the project by saying: "I'm doing what women have been doing since the beginning of time, which is giving birth. But on a more existential level, I'm giving birth to art & creativity & we would be lost without both".

After allegedly refusing to loan a rare piece of Kahlo's artwork to the Detroit Institute of Arts, she garnered criticism. However, cultural critic Vince Carducci in one conclusion said that "my suspicion is that the request never bubbled up to her". Art journalist Lindsay Pollock said that she could not understand why Madonna "has no love" for Andreas Gursky after a report that a work that he gave to the singer was on sale at Sotheby's. In January 2023, Brigitte Fouré, major of French city Amiens asked Madonna to led Jérôme-Martin Langlois's lost painting Diana and Endymion to the city, as it  may be in her private collection. Thinking of Madonna as the possible owner, Fouré believes the singer obtained the artwork without permission, by saying "Clearly, we don't contest in any way that you have acquired this work legally".

Performing arts and artistic production 

The development of her work from a creative perspective and her footprints within different performing arts were commented on by different sociologists and others, including Jane Miller and Mark Watts. Kyra Belán, an art historian and professor from Broward College, stated she achieved major success as an artist within several art forms, further labeling her as a female achievement.

Rather than a musician, Madonna was considered a performer. Author Jason Hanley, commented that her performances made critics and scholars "stand up" and take note of her sound, style and message. Paul Rutherford, professor at the University of Toronto considered her a visual performer with "extraordinary stage presence". Italian scholars from University of Macerata, concurred that she has constructed an innovative "poetics of performances". Canadian professor Karlene Faith commented that her videos and live performances, reveal "an uncommon conceptual and artful imagination". A scholar commented that Madonna is the first to mark the passage from "performativity" as a way of doing to a way of being. In Women in Russian Theatre (2013), however, Catherine Schule explained that some "avant-garde critics regard her performances as trendy schlock rather than legitimate art".

Stage shows

Madonna's live shows are regarded as organized sequences of events, scripts, known texts and movements. According to music critic Michael Heatley, she "always set high standards with her stage shows". Described as tableaux vivants, for senior lecturer Ian Inglis, her live performances are "theatrical events", while others deem them "immaculate performances". Writing for Slant Magazine in 2015, Sal Cinquemani considered her "the greatest performer of our time", saying that she is a showgirl with theatrical shows of narrative storytelling. Another group, explained how she divided into "thematic categories" her concerts in unusual forms. In William Baker's words, the splitting of sections derived that pretty much everyone copies or everyone is inspired by.

Madonna has been credited with propelling various artistic concepts for stage shows and tours in her generation. Fashion journalist William Baker mentioned that "the modern pop concert experience was created by Madonna really". Lester Brathwaite from Logo TV, said she "transformed the concept of a rock concert from a mere live show into true performance art". Scholars and journalists, including Berrin Yanıkkaya and Matt Cain, detailed how she "paved the way" of extravaganza in concerts as a theatrical spectacle and having the female figure at center stage. If a specific title is mentioned, it is generally the Blond Ambition World Tour, for which Jacob Bernstein of The New York Times recognized other musicians, but with Madonna, he says, the singer both set the tone and the bar of modern megatours.

Videos

Madonna's videos received a considerable critical attention in the MTV Generation and beyond. Professor Rutherford said her videos have been part of Madonna's visual presentation and artistic renditions. They were considered not merely commercial productions, but visual performances. Rutherford noted how she put considerable time and money into crafting what were often elaborate productions (she owns several of the most expensive videos in history). She forged collaborative friendships with an array of photographers, directors and videomakers. By diverse measurements, Madonna was credited as "the first female artist to exploit fully the potential of the music video".

Reviews of her music videos played a major role for her academic scrutiny. A scholar argued she became "the most analyzed" figure from the rest of female music video stars. In the mid 1990s, Martha Bayles recalled it is more important one's relation to the visual arts instead one's musical statement, concluding that's why pundits, professors and preachers go cross-eyed trying to interpret Madonna, "taking her far more seriously than others". The influence and association of Madonna with the format were so solid that professor Norman Fairclough made the suggestion that "the evolution of the music video could indeed be studied through Madonna". Critic Armond White even credited Madonna with helping to "popularize" the music video. In similar remarks, Sarah Frink from Consequence mentioned Michael Jackson, but felt it was Madonna that helped set the standard for the music video. Similar connotations were discussed by editors from VH1, and Slant Magazine.

Her influence in the videos as an art form, was commented on by White, who said "she elevated this into a memorable expressive art form", and noted her "art-consciousness" influence in artists such as Björk or Lady Gaga. He called Madonna's connection with that zeitgeist "historic".

Dancing

According to professor Thomas Harrison of Jacksonville University, "others have considered that her role as a musician and producer is secondary to her role as a dancer". Madonna started off as a dancer (modern dance), and it was a "thing that separates her" from others, said choreographer Richmond Talauega. Rolling Stone staffers commented she is "entirely synonymous with dancing".

Various scholars and dance critics have reviewed Madonna in the artistic discipline. American sociologist Cindy Patton was one of the first in articulate the cultural and proto-political effects of dance culture with Madonna. A The Guardian dance critic, noted her forays within several dance forms, from serious art to club trends.

Madonna's artistic concepts within dance forms was also remarked. Included in Rolling Stones poll of the "10 Favorite Dancing Musicians", Madonna was credited by the magazine to help bringing many underground dancing or its elements into the mainstream culture. Publishing company, DK noted her influence in dance styles such as voguing and krumping saying she made them "globally popular". Madonna was even initially perceived as the "inventor" of voguing by many. Similarly, a 1994 article from Public Culture, said the gay ball dance form was popularized by Madonna "in a way that made it seem like she practically invented it". Others noted Madonna's influence in rave culture fo her generation.

The Smithsonian Institution said Madonna transformed pop concerts into dance spectacles, further crediting her with popularizing the use of headset microphones to allow greater movement and used choreography.  While she was not the first, due to her prominent usage, a model became known as "Madonna mic". The institution also deemed Madonna as the first performer to use her tours as reenactments of her music videos.

Acting 
Madonna's acting career was also analyzed from film studies, with British cultural theorist Angela McRobbie, adding she was analyzed from perspectives of feminist film theory. Her industry reception, however, at best was "mixed" according to a The Daily Telegraph contributor. Los Angeles Times echoed criticisms and counter-criticisms, with editors of Encyclopedia of Women in Today's World (2011), noting how some have seen her films or acting as "notable". Her films such as Madonna: Truth or Dare, and Desperately Seeking Susan, garnered cult status in some audiences.

Depictions and accolades

According to English writer Andrew Morton, various of her films have been exhibited in museums around the world, including the Pompidou Center in Paris, as modern works of art. In 2016, MoMA PS1 screened Madonna: Truth or Dare celebrating its 25th anniversary and its impact, including the arts. She received a comedic tribute in 2009 named Almost Human: Madonna on Film, hosted by David Schmader at Central Cinema, while Metrograph devoted the Body of Word: A Madonna Retrospective in 2016, a five-days retrospective celebrating her film career.

Her music videos have been part of art exhibitions as well, and this include «Bedtime Story» displayed in permanent exhibitions at Museum of Modern Art (MoMA) and then in Museum of the Moving Image of London. Other entities like the School of Visual Arts screened the video as well. The 2000 article Madonna and Hypertext, published by the National Art Education Association in their Studies in Art Education, explored two Madonna's videos. In 2018, Madonna was awarded by the High School of Performing Arts in Malaga (in Spanish: Escuela Superior de Artes Escénicas de Málaga, ESAEM). They rendered a performance tribute called Madonna Revolution.

Artistic reception

Postmodernism
Postmodernism encompasses a variety of approaches and movements, including aesthetics. It shaped early views on Madonna, with professor Arthur Asa Berger commenting, "much has been said of her 'postmodernism'", and adding that it was a time when discussing Madonna in this context was popular in academic circles. Berger further explains that a simple way of thinking about postmodernism is as the way in which "our contemporary artists and culture produce art". English writer Lucy O'Brien held that "much has been made of Madonna as a postmodern icon", as well as that her reference points have been resolutely modernist.

Madonna was suggested by assistant professor Olivier Sécardin of Utrecht University to epitomize postmodernism. Christian writer Graham Cray gives his point of view, once commenting "Madonna is perhaps the most visible example of what is called post-modernism", while for Martin Amis she is "perhaps the most postmodern personage on the planet". Academics Sudhir Venkatesh and Fuat Firat deemed her as "representative of postmodern rebellion". According to Glenn Ward, "Madonna has been important to postmodernism for her ability to plunder the conventions".

American philosopher Susan Bordo described her as a "postmodern heroine", and she was also labeled both icon and "Queen of postmodernism".

Criticisms and ambiguity

Late-twentieth-century perspectives on Madonna engaged viewers, art community and scholars by discussing low and high culture value in her figure and works. By the early 1990s, three academics conducted a survey to by college students, where Madonna was seen as "all artifice and no art" and "as emblematic of the lowest form of aesthetic culture". They compared Madonna's art to being "suspicious, because unlike the works of Vincent van Gogh or Henri Matisse, it is readily available for purchase at any record or video store", implying that she did not belong to a high art tradition of selflessness.

English art critic John Berger, also add that her work's accessibility to a mass public may have contributed to a decrease in its perceived value. Academics like Douglas Kellner, on the contrary suggested that Madonna should be interpreted in both terms, and her works by implication can thus be read either as works of art or analyzed as "commodities" that shrewdly exploit markets. Kriston Capps from New York, commented that Jeff Koons made conspicuous consumption a concern of fine art, but Madonna immortalized it with "Material Girl". To Italian art critic Achille Bonito Oliva, the song was perfect for a time when art, money and politics were electronically entwined. Citing three scholars' poll, Simon Frith stated "clearly, pushing Madonna to the bottom rungs of the pop cultural ladder makes a space at the top for pop music 'art'".

Her broadcast profile as an artiste in the arts-based BBC One series Omnibus divided art community and public, and according to British art historian, John A. Walker, "letters and articles subsequently appeared in the press both for and against Madonna". Michael Ignatieff claimed that Madonna's conception of art was false, that she was not a "serious artist". He was quoted as saying, "I certainly don't mind that she is obscene [...] What I can't stand about Madonna is that she thinks she's an artist". In previous years, in 1988, professor of media arts John Ellis questioned the idea of having Madonna in Omnibus.

Madonna's sexuality has worked both for and against her. In Madonnaland (2016), Alina Simone denotes that "her art is highly sexualized because she is highly sexualized". Her first book, Sex was considered an art book. The outlet Contemporary Art pointed out that by "bringing together arty images" the book raised interesting questions about when art is acceptable. In using religious art, Madonna has been called an iconoclast, and has received criticism from the religious sector.

Through her career, as Dahlia Schweitzer explains in 2019, many critics have long resisted using the words "Madonna" and "artistic" in the same sentence. Back in 2013, Sandra Barneda from the website The Objective, observed that for many "she is far" from art. Michael Love wrote for Paper magazine in 2019, that both her music and visuals "have always been interpreted as 'good' or 'bad' based on what's relevant in the moment".

Alternative views

In On Fashion (1994) by scholars Shari Benstock and Suzanne Ferriss, it was concluded that Madonna challenges and "puts in question and tests one's aesthetic categories and commitments", but she can be viewed as a modernist. Other scholars compared how Madonna's failure to conform to established rules and commentary have led to her dismissal as a serious artist and fueled attacks on her. Walker, the British art historian proposes that "there are few art forms and artists capable of providing such exhilarating experiences and this is why Madonna has attracted so many". He further prompted that it is evident "she fully understands that art depends upon artifice, creation, invention, imagination and masquerade".

Pamela Robertson from the University of Notre Dame addressed how "Madonna's art and its reception by critics and fans reflect and shape some of our culture's anxieties about identity and power inequalities". In the early 1990s, American musicologist Susan McClary questioned some criticisms towards Madonna, but provided arguments in her area to refute some of them, explaining that the framework in which Madonna operates is somewhat different from that of the Western art tradition, in which feminine subjects must be destroyed. She also said Madonna exercises control over her art. In 1990, music critic Jon Pareles invited the audience to see her as a "continuous multi-media art project".

Years later, in 2002, Black Belt editor Sara Fogan observed that Madonna "challenges herself as an artist", and by 2022, Italian academics from the University of Macerata considered: "Madonna is not a common artist, but a hypertrophic system of signs and symbols bound to the worlds of spectacle, art, music, cinema and fashion".

Recognition
Following Michael Jackson's death, a panel of Argentine art critics deemed her at that time as "the only universal artist left standing" of an entire era. Those critics, including Daniel Molina, Graciela Speranza and Alicia de Arteaga explained that she is herself "a multimedia expression that condenses fashion, dance, photography, sculpture, music, video and painting". She has been criticized by other musicians, but also praised by others. In the latter group, Kanye West commented in 2014: "Madonna, I think, is the greatest visual musical artist that we've ever had". Shania Twain also praised her vision of aesthetics in 2023. She is the "perfect example" of the visual artist, noted graffiti artist, and cultural commentator Fab Five Freddy.

In the mid-2010s, Madonna classified herself as an artist and not a "pop act".   She was also quoted as saying, in the 1990s: "I am my own experiment. I am my own work of art". Writing for Interview in 2014, American illusionist David Blaine suggested that perhaps she "is herself her own greatest work of art—something so vastly influential as to be unfathomable". John R. May, a professor of English and religious studies at Louisiana State University concludes that the singer is a contemporary gesamtkunstwerk becoming a work of pop-art herself. In 2008, Scottish music blogger Alan McGee proposes that she is "post-modern art, the likes of which we will never see again".

Influence

According to Stephanie Eckardt from W, her impact and influence in the arts have been "made almost entirely behind the scenes". In 2023, editor Jordan Robertson called it "a significant impact in the world of art".

A number of observers have explained how Madonna influenced the link between art and pop stage. An editor credited Madonna for making collaborations with pop artists routine. In this aspect, Eckardt similarly argued she pioneered the crossover between pop and art by hanging with the likes of Warhol, Basquiat or Haring. Editors of Enciclopedia gay (2009) also recognized Madonna's footprints in different fields of the arts, concluding that no artist has done as much to push the boundaries of pop music into the art world. Marissa G. Muller from W also praised her contribution to bridging the worlds of pop music and fine art. Others explored how Madonna brought art from the streets into the mainstream. Talking about her formative years in New York, Malina Bickford from Vice commented on her influence in bringing the underground to the mainstream.

Italian art critic Francesco Bonami, called her the Picasso from music world. Ana Monroy Yglesias from the Grammy Awards website called her the Art-pop queen. For Mark Bego, she has "turning everything she touches into classic pop art".

On other artists

She took inspiration from other plastic artists, and music journalist Ricardo Pineda told EFE, that her mentions and references were favorable for their legacies. Madonna's own influence has been found in various contemporary artists. Mateo Blanco, commented: "Madonna has always been a great inspiration to me". American installation artist Trisha Baga has a "longstanding fascination" with Madonna which "is often manifested in her work", according to Dundee Contemporary Arts' website. Pegasus told the Evening Standard that he always listens to Madonna while working, and his works "tends to have elements of her character". In 2014, curator Jefferson Hack dedicated an article in which she was "interpreted by contemporary artists" with portraits in art forms and their feelings about her.

Different media reports have shown her influence on other lesser-known artists, and from the underground scene. In terms of influence, the Greek Reporter said that Greek graffiti artist George Callas has a "creative obsession" with her. Madonna has always been an inspiration for Spanish painter Jesús Arrúe. Brazilian visual artist, Aldo Diaz, who also collaborated with her, talked about Madonna's influence for him to the point he began to study photography, arts and became a graphic designer. Most of them have depicted Madonna.

Impact on Frida Kahlo cult

Madonna attracted media headlines when she revealed her interest in Frida Kahlo during the late 20th-century; Kahlo was considered to be a relatively lesser-known figure on the international stage outside the arts. Andrew Morton reflected: "How many pop singers have ever heard of Frida Kahlo?". In 1993, Janis Bergman-Carton published a scholarly article in Texas Studies in Literature and Language that examined how "both women have become part of standard journalistic reportage", with mutual benefit.

From the art world, to the media and academia, numerous agents expressed Madonna's importance for developing the public's interest in Kahlo. In 2005, The Daily Telegraph staffers credited Madonna with transforming Kahlo into a "collector's darling". British art historian, John A. Walker, commented that partly due to Madonna, the Mexican painter became a posthumous celebrity not only in the domain of art history but also in popular culture. Canadian art historian, Gauvin Alexander Bailey also concurred that she helped spark a wide interest in the artist. Historian Hayden Herrera added that the mention of Madonna sets the tone for the entire piece. Magazine Artes de México also referred to the importance of Madonna in the "Fridomania" cult. According to El Sol de Tampico, Madonna drew media attention to Alejandro Gómez Arias, a former Kahlo boyfriend.

Artistic depictions

Madonna has been depicted by numerous artists around the world, including those that she influenced. Alone the book Madonna in Art (2004), compiled portraits and paintings by over 116 artists from 23 countries, including Andrew Logan, Sebastian Krüger, Al Hirschfeld, and Peter Howson. The book which contains over 244 artworks and 190 pages, is noted by its author as a "tribute to Madonna and her remarkable career in art".
 
Others have depicted Madonna multiple times. Scottish painter Howson, who dedicated numerous pieces to Madonna, commented in 2002: "She's a subject everyone is drawn to". Scottish academic Alan Riach, explained that the Madonnas of Howson address the question of assertion, strength and power. In his final years, Mexican painter Alberto Gironella devoted almost all his works to Madonna, or took inspiration from her, claiming that "more than pop [she] is the last surrealist". Gironella was reported to have an "obsession" with Madonna, described as an amour fou by an outlet from the National Council for Culture and the Arts in Mexico. According to the Museum of Contemporary Art, Monterrey he started with his Madonnas in 1991.

According to the portal Universo Online, Madonna became a muse for her boyfriend Jean-Michel Basquiat, who depicted her in his art. A Panel of Experts was inspired by his lovers, Madonna and Canadian painter Suzanne Mallouk. Madonna reported that Andy Warhol and Keith Haring did four pieces for her as a gift for her wedding with Sean Penn.

Spanish plastic artist, Mikel Belascoain created the first art building of Pamplona, capital city of Navarra, Spain with several paintings of Madonna called Madonna 1986. Belascoain reported to be more interested in Madonna as an artist than Marcel Duchamp. In 2005, South African artist Candice Breitz created Queen (Portrait of Madonna), a multichannel video installation featuring 24 Italian Madonna fans performing their way individually, through Madonna's The Immaculate Collection album on a grid of monitors. It has been exhibited in museums like SCAD Museum of Art or Museum of Fine Arts, Boston. Art critic Roberta Smith of The New York Times commented positively on this artwork.

In Madonnaland, Alina Simone explained that graffiti artist Adam Cost had begun wheat pasting his "Cost Fucked Madonna" mantra all over Manhattan in the 20th century. Simone discovered that "Cost" was his pseudonym, and his stickers reading "Cost Fucked Madonna" became an underground catch-phrase in the 1990s, spurring a healthy trade in knock-off T-shirts and other merchandise. Following his comeback after his arrest, "Cost Fucked Madonna" posters began reappearing on the streets of New York in 2012.

Selected gallery

Art exhibitions and museums depictions

French academic Georges-Claude Guilbert noticed that her likeness has been exhibited in museums.

In honor of Madonna, Johnnie Walker organized the art exposition Arte urbana – Projeto Keep Walking Brazil in 2012. It featured works by 30 different graffiti artists. The same year, a Colombian art exhibition was presented at EAFIT University curated by María Patricia García Mejía, under the title Como una oración (in English: Like a Prayer), to show the Madonnas of pop artist Javier Restrepo, and demonstrating how "Madonna's universality touched" the plastic arts.

In 2013, the Guayaquil Municipal Museum hosted a multidisciplinary exhibition, titled Madonna: Ícono cultural-arte, moda y filatelia that explored Madonna's impact and references in arts, fashion, philately and numismatics. In 2017, Lea & Flò Palace hosted the Italian contemporary art exhibition Thank you Madonna – I miei sogni in technicolors, curated by Michalangelo Prencipe.

Madonna has been part of the theme of different exhibitions. She had a special segment in Alberto Gironella's retrospective of 2004, Alberto Gironella. Barón de Betenebros, and in his 1994 display, Más que pop, Madonna es la única surrealista. M- de Marilyn à Madonna was on display in Brazil in 2014, to commemorate Marilyn Monroe's death and Madonna's birthday, both of which occurred in the month of August. It featured 46 artworks of different artists.

Madonna was part of the exhibition De Madonna a Madonna (in English: From Madonna to Madonna) installed in countries such as Chile (Centro Cultural Matucana 100), Spain (MUSAC) and Argentina (Juan B. Castagnino Fine Arts Museum) to approach the role of women throughout history.

Sculptures

Around 1988, in the town of Pacentro, Italy (the city of her paternal grandparents) some residents proposed putting up a 13-foot statue of a bustier-wearing Madonna, hoping as much to attract tourists as to bestow honorary citizenship on its "most famous descendent", but the proposal was vetoed by the mayor and others. The Italian sculptor Walter Pugni, who planned to erect the bronze statue, showed a 2-foot clay model to the press and justified her as "a symbol for our children and represents a better world for them in the year 2000". Brazilian plastic artist, Nico Rocha created in 1993, a 2.3-foot statue of Madonna to commemorate her 10-year career and her first visit to Brazil.

Several Madame Tussauds around the world and in the United States have wax effigies of Madonna. By 1999, the Estonian outlet Sõnumileht ranked one of them third on their best-of list of Tussauds' wax sculpture. Madame Tussauds Sydney, launched simultaneously three different Madonna's wax statues, making the first time they revealed that amount of one female performer in their history according to themselves. She is also depicted France's Musée Grévin, among other places.

See also
 Madonna and religion

References

Book sources

External links
 Madonna at The British Museum
 Madonna at National Portrait Gallery, London
 Madonna at Detroit Historical Museum
 Madonna at Victoria and Albert Museum
 "Mother of Creation" series at SuperRare

Further reading
 Madonna, no sweat — Govett-Brewster Art Gallery (1993, pp 9–10 by artist Ruth Watson)

Contemporary arts
American art collectors
Private art collections
People associated with the arts